Christian Henel (born 28 January 1988) is a German former professional footballer who played as a forward.

Career
Henel was born in Bad Dürkheim, West Germany. At the age of 15, he left his hometown Bad Dürkheim where he played for SV 1911 Bad Dürkheim to go to 1. FC Kaiserslautern which played in the Bundesliga. After three years in the youth ranks of the club he became the opportunity to play with the second team in the Regionalliga Süd while the first team had to join the 2. Bundesliga. Although the second squad of FCK had no chance to stay in the 3. Liga, Henel had an important role in the team and could score eight times in 29 games. From summer 2007, he was part of the first team and played twice in the 2. Bundesliga.

In summer 2010, he joined SV Darmstadt 98.

References

External links
 
 

1988 births
Living people
People from Bad Dürkheim
Footballers from Rhineland-Palatinate
German footballers
Association football forwards
Germany youth international footballers
2. Bundesliga players
1. FC Kaiserslautern players
1. FC Kaiserslautern II players
SV Darmstadt 98 players
Wormatia Worms players
KSV Hessen Kassel players
FK Pirmasens players
TuS Mechtersheim players